
This is a list of aircraft in alphabetical order beginning with 'S'.

Sg

SG Aviation 
(SG Aviation srl (now called Storm Aircraft), Sabaudia, Italy)
 SG Aviation Rallye
 SG Aviation Storm 280
 SG Aviation Storm 300
 SG Aviation Storm 320E
 SG Aviation Sea Storm

SGCIM
(Société Générale des Constructions Industrielles et Mécaniques)
see also: Borel
 SGCIM CAN.2
 SGCIM CAP.2
 SGCIM 1924 flying boat
 SGCIM 1924 tri-motor
 SGCIM C.1
 SGCIM C.2

References

Further reading

External links

 List Of Aircraft (S)

de:Liste von Flugzeugtypen/N–S
fr:Liste des aéronefs (N-S)
nl:Lijst van vliegtuigtypes (N-S)
pt:Anexo:Lista de aviões (N-S)
ru:Список самолётов (N-S)
sv:Lista över flygplan/N-S
vi:Danh sách máy bay (N-S)